FC Carl Zeiss Jena is a German women's football club from Jena, Thuringia. The club currently plays in the Bundesliga, the highest level of women's football in Germany.

Carl Zeiss Jena played regional women's football since 2016/17 but became more prominent, when it merged with FF USV Jena in 2020.

History

HSG Uni Jena, USV Jena, FF USV Jena 

After becoming the last East German women's football champion in 1991, Uni Jena was admitted to the Bundesliga after the reunification of Germany. They were relegated after one season and have remained in the 2nd tier league (then Regionalliga, later 2nd Bundesliga) since then. In 2003 Jena became champions of the northeastern Regionalliga but failed to achieve promotion to the Bundesliga. The decisive match was lost at home against Hamburger SV. A year later they qualified for the newly founded 2nd Bundesliga and were grouped into the southern division.

In 2004 a new women's club was founded, so the USV Jena became the FF USV Jena (FF for Frauenfußball, women's football)

In 2005 and 2006 they came in third, in 2007 even in second place. In the 2007–08 season, Jena finished first in the 2nd Bundesliga Süd and got promoted to the Bundesliga. In 2008–09 the managed a 9th place and improved to an 8th place the next season. The team's biggest success was reaching the final of the 2009–10 Frauen DFB-Pokal, where they lost 0–1 to FCR 2001 Duisburg.

From 1 July 2020 on, the club will play under a new name, after agreeing to a merger with the men's football club FC Carl Zeiss Jena.

Carl Zeiss's women's section
Carl Zeiss entered a women's team in the Thüringenliga, the 4th level, for the first time in the 2017/18 season. It remained in that league for three years, finishing first eventually. The team was created by transferring over USV Jena III. USV Jena kept their first two teams.

Merger with Carl Zeiss 
After the 2019/20 season FF USV Jena, transferred all their teams to FC Carl Zeiss Jena, in order to combine forces and benefit of the larger club with its image.

Current squad

Staff
 Head coach: Christopher Heck
 Assistant coach: Thilo Osterbrink, Susann Utes
 Goalkeeper coach: Stephan Fleischhauer
 Fitness coach: Martin Buder

Former notable players

  Anna Blässe
  Carolin Schiewe
  Ivonne Hartmann
  Sabrina Schmutzler
  Carol Carioca
  Genoveva Añonman
  Adjoa Bayor
  Abby Erceg
  Fata Salkunič
  Lara Keller
  Hannah Keane

References

External links
 
 

 
Women's football clubs in Germany
Football clubs in Thuringia
Sport in Jena
University of Jena
Association football clubs established in 2004
2004 establishments in Germany
Frauen-Bundesliga clubs